Miguel Casellas (born 24 October 1938) is a Puerto Rican competitive sailor. He competed in the 470 event at the 1972 Summer Olympics in Munich and the 1976 Summer Olympics in Montreal.

References

External links
 

1938 births
Living people
Puerto Rican male sailors (sport)
Olympic sailors of Puerto Rico
Sailors at the 1976 Summer Olympics – 470
Place of birth missing (living people)
20th-century Puerto Rican people